RealtySouth is an Alabama-based real estate company comprising over 1,000 sales associates in 27 locations across Alabama. It is a member of the Berkshire Hathaway family of companies.

History 
RealtySouth was formed in 1955 by the merger of Johnson-Rast & Hays, Brigham-Williams, First Real Estate, and Ray & Company. 

In 2002, it was acquired by HomeServices of America, a holding of Berkshire Hathaway. Since its founding in 1955, RealtySouth has served more than 125,000 buyers and sellers.

In 2014, the company was ordered to pay a $500,000 fine for alleged violations of the Real Estate Settlement Procedures Act (RESPA), with the specific claim that RealtySouth improperly urged, and in some cases, required, customers to use RealtySouth's own title insurer, TitleSouth. While not admitting any wrongdoing, RealtySouth agreed to a consent order requiring them to pay the $500,000 fine and to alter their customer paperwork to allow for a more clear choice of title insurers.

References

External links 
 
 Palm Springs Neighborhoods

Real estate companies of the United States
Companies based in Birmingham, Alabama
Real estate companies established in 1955
1955 establishments in Alabama